The American Ship Building Company was the dominant shipbuilder on the Great Lakes before the Second World War.  It started as Cleveland Shipbuilding in Cleveland, Ohio in 1888 and opened the yard in Lorain, Ohio in 1898.  It changed its name to the American Ship Building Company in 1900, when it acquired Superior Shipbuilding, in Superior, Wisconsin; Toledo Shipbuilding, in Toledo, Ohio; and West Bay Shipbuilding, in West Bay City, Michigan.  With the coming of World War I, the company also acquired Buffalo Dry Dock, in Buffalo, New York; Chicago Shipbuilding, in Chicago, Illinois; and Detroit Shipbuilding, in Wyandotte, Michigan. American Shipbuilding ranked 81st among United States corporations in the value of World War II military production contracts.

The Lorain Yard
The Lorain, Ohio Yard served as the main facility of the company after World War II and to this day five of the 13 separate  ore carriers on the Great Lakes were built in Lorain, including the M/V Paul R. Tregurtha which is the largest vessel on the Great Lakes (1,013'06" long). Built in 1898, the Lorain Yard quickly grew in size and importance. The Lorain Yard closed in 1984 after a series of labor disputes. Most of the buildings associated with shipyard were demolished with only the water tower and Ship Building Pattern Warehouse remaining. The pattern warehouse is now The Shipyards dining and events venue. The remaining lands are now being redeveloped as an upscale housing development.

Ships built by the company

 , launched in 1892 in Cleveland, Ohio
 , launched in 1892 as a lake freighter, originally as the SS Samuel Mather
 , launched in 1896 in Cleveland
 , launched in 1897 in Cleveland
 , launched in 1902, in Cleveland originally as the Manistique-Marquette & Northern No. 1
 , built in 1909 in Lorain, Ohio, sunk in the Great Lakes Storm of 1913
 , launched in 1910 in Lorain, Ohio, sunk in the Great Lakes Storm of 1913
 , built in 1906 for the Acme Transit Company, later sunk in the Great Lakes Storm of 1913
 , built in 1903 in Cleveland
 SS Milwaukee Clipper, built in 1904 in Cleveland, originally as the Juniata, for the Anchor Line 
 , originally built in 1913 as the Seeandbee in Lorain
 , originally built in 1924 as the Greater Buffalo in Lorain
 , launched in 1927 in Lorain, later Outarde, broken up at Port Colborne 1985
 , launched in 1943 in Lorain
 , built in 1952 in Lorain
 , built in 1927 in Lorain
 , launched in 1942 in Lorain
 , launched in 1943 in Lorain
 , launched in 1943 in Lorain
 , launched in 1943 in Cleveland
 , launched in 1943 in Cleveland
 , launched in 1944 in Lorain
 , launched in 1944 in Lorain
 , launched in 1943, Cleveland
 , launched in 1943, Cleveland
 , launched in 1943, Buffalo
 , launched in 1967 in Lorain
 , launched in 1967 in Lorain
 , launched in 1967 in Lorain
 , launched in 1967 in Lorain
 , launched in 1968 in Lorain
 , launched in 1968 in Lorain
 , launched in 1968 in Lorain
 , launched in 1972 in Lorain.
 , launched in 1985, Tampa Shipyards (subsidiary of The American Ship Building Company)

Delta Shipbuilding
During the Second World War, the company managed Delta Shipbuilding Company for the United States Maritime Commission. Delta had a yard at New Orleans and built a total of 188 ships.  Delta Shipbuilding Company built 187 Liberty ships, the first completed was SS William C.C. Claiborne, named after the first governor of Louisiana, William C. C. Claiborne. The United States Maritime Commission had Delta and eight other emergency shipyards start building Liberty ships in 1941, 2,710 were produced during the war. Many were built in less than two months. The Delta shipyard was started specifically for the war effort, at a site on the Industrial Canal near the Almonaster Avenue Bridge, immediately south of the present-day I-10 high-rise bridge.  The yard was shut down after the end of World War II.

Sample of ships built:

SS Martin Behrman
SS Josiah Parker
SS Timothy Bloodworth
USS Hesperia (AKS-13)
SS Charles Henderson
SS Benjamin Contee
USS Panda (IX-125)
USS Gratia (AKS-11)
USS Cybele (AKS-10)
USS Kochab (AKS-6)
USS Porcupine (IX-126)
USS Basilan
SS James Eagan Layne
USS Burias (AG-69)
USS Wildcat (AW-2)
USS Stag (AW-1)
USS Hecuba (AKS-12)

Toledo Shipbuilding Company

Steinbrenners 
In the early 1960s, the American Shipbuilding Company acquired Kinsman Marine Transit Company, which was owned by the Steinbrenner family. As a result of the transaction, the Steinbrenner family acquired a controlling interest in American Shipbuilding. Frustrated after years of fighting with unions over cost-saving work changes, the Steinbrenners closed the Lorain shipyard in December 1983 and moved all operations to Tampa, Florida.  The principal member of the Steinbrenner family who was involved in the operation of the transit company at this time was George Steinbrenner, who became better known later as the principal owner of the New York Yankees.

The company began having difficulties in the 1980s, going through a bankruptcy in 1993. The company was sold in 1995.

See also 
Robert Logan, general manager.
Pendleton Shipyard Company

References

External links
AmShip Lorain, Lorain OH

Defunct shipbuilding companies of the United States
Manufacturing companies based in Cleveland
Defunct manufacturing companies based in Ohio
Manufacturing companies established in 1888